Adrian Cowell (2 February 1934 – 11 October 2011) was a British filmmaker, born in Tongshan or Tangshan, China. He was best known for producing documentaries about Chico Mendes and deforestation in the Amazon and the opium/heroin trade out of the Shan States, Burma (Myanmar).

While a student at Cambridge, Cowell planned (but was unable to take part in) the 1954 Oxford and Cambridge Trans-Africa Expedition, and took part in the 1955-6 Oxford and Cambridge Far Eastern Expedition to Singapore and the 1957-8 Oxford and Cambridge Expedition to South America. It was on the latter expedition team that Cowell met the Villas-Bôas brothers and left the Oxford and Cambridge Expedition to join them on the Centro Geographico Expedition to find the geographical centre of Brazil. This was the beginning of his connection with South America and, in particular, Brazil.

Cowell was awarded the Royal Geographical Society's Cherry Kearton Medal and Award in 1985, and in 1991 won the Founders Award at the International Emmys. In his obituary in The Guardian, Anthony Hayward wrote that he was "one of the most successful" documentary makers of his generation. His documentaries about the rain forest brought the subject significant political attention.

Family
Cowell married Pilly Chamberlayne in 1960; they divorced in 2008. Their union produced a daughter, Boojie, and a son, Xingu. Cowell formed an extramarital relationship with Barbara Bramble in 1987. Xingu Cowell died in a canoeing accident in 1986.

Works
 The Heart of the Forest, 1960
 Carnival of Violence, in 3 parts: 1960, 1962, 1966
 Raid into Tibet, 1966
 The Unknown War, 1966
 The Opium Trail, 1966
 The Tribe That Hides from Man, 1970
 The Kingdom in the Jungle, 1971
 The Opium Warlords, 1974
 Opium, 1978
 The Ashes of the Forest, 1984
 Banking On Disaster, 1987
 The Crusade for the Forest, 1990
 
 The Heroin Wars, 1996
 
 The Last of the Hiding Tribes, 1999
 Fires of the Amazon, 2002

References

External links
 Official Adrian Cowell web site

1934 births
2011 deaths
British documentary filmmakers
International Emmy Founders Award winners